This is a list of notable events in music that took place in the year 1917.

Specific locations
1917 in British music
1917 in Norwegian music

Specific genres
1917 in country music
1917 in jazz

Events
March 7 – "Livery Stable Blues", recorded with "Dixie Jazz Band One Step" on February 26 by the Original Dixieland Jass Band (a white 5-piece group from New Orleans led by cornetist Nick LaRocca) for the Victor Talking Machine Company in the United States, becomes the first jazz recording commercially released (described as a "foxtrot"). On August 17 the band records "Tiger Rag"
May 12 – Béla Bartók's ballet The Wooden Prince is premiered in Budapest
 First African American jazz recordings made by Wilbur Sweatman's Band
 Eddie Cantor makes his first recordings
 Songs of the First World War become popular in the U.S.

Bands formed
See :Category:Musical groups established in 1917

Published popular music
 "All The World Will Be Jealous Of Me" w. Al Dubin m. Ernest R. Ball
 "Any Time Is Kissing Time" w. Oscar Asche m. Frederic Norton from the musical Chu Chin Chow
 "Are You From Heaven?" w.m. L. Wolfe Gilbert & Anatole Friedland
 "At the Jazz Band Ball" w.m. Edwin B. Edwards, Nick LaRocca, Tony Spargo & Larry Shields
 "A Bachelor Gay" w. Frank Clifford Harris & (Arthur) Valentine m. James W. Tate from the musical The Maid of the Mountains
 "Barnyard Blues" w.m. Edwin B. Edwards, Nick La Rocca, Tony Sbarbaro & Larry Shields
 "The Bells Of St Mary's" w. Douglas Furber m. A. Emmett Adams
 "The Bombo-Shay" by Henry Creamer

 "Bring Back My Daddy to Me" m. George W. Meyer w. William Tracey & Howard Johnson
 "Bring Me A Rose" w.m. Charles Shisler
 "Cheer Up, Liza" John L. Golden, Raymond Hubbell
 "Cleopatra Had A Jazz Band" w. Jack Coogan m. Jimmy Morgan
 "Come To The Fair" w. Helen Taylor m. Easthope Martin
 "The Darktown Strutters' Ball" w.m. Shelton Brooks
 "Dixie Jass Band One-Step" Original Dixieland Jass Band
 "Down in the Valley" trad US
 "Eileen (Alanna Asthore)" w. Henry Blossom m. Victor Herbert
 "For Me And My Gal" w. Edgar Leslie & E. Ray Goetz m. George W. Meyer
 "For Your Country and My Country" w.m. Irving Berlin
 "Give a Man a Horse He Can Ride" w. James Thomson m. Geoffrey O'Hara
 "Give Me the Moonlight, Give Me the Girl" w. Lew Brown m. Albert Von Tilzer
 "Going Up" w. Otto Harbach m. Louis A. Hirsch
 "Good Luck and God Be With You, Laddie Boy" w. Will D. Cobb m. Gus Edwards
 "Good Bye Broadway, Hello France" w. C. Francis Reisner & Benny Davis m. Billy Baskette

 "Goodbye, Ma! Goodbye, Pa! Goodbye, Mule, with Yer Old Hee-Haw!" w. William Herschell m. Barclay Walker
 "'Good-bye,' That Means You" w. Andrew B. Sterling m. Arthur Lange
 "Good-bye-ee" w.m. R. P. Weston & Bert Lee
 "Hail, Hail, the Gang's All Here" w. D. A. Esrom (pseudonym of Dolly Morse) m. Theodore F. Morse & Arthur Sullivan
 "Have A Heart" w. P. G. Wodehouse m. Jerome Kern
 "Hawaiian Butterfly" w. George A. Little m. Billy Baskette & Joseph H. Santley
 "Homeward Bound" m. George Meyer w. Howard Johnson and Coleman Goetz
 "Homing" w. Arthur L. Salmon m. Teresa del Riego
 "How Can I Forget When There's So Much To Remember" w.m. Irving Berlin
 "Huckleberry Finn" by Cliff Hess
 "I Don't Know Where I'm Going But I'm On My Way" w.m. George Fairman
 "I Don't Want to Get Well" w. Howard Johnson & Harry Pease m. Harry Jentes
 "I May Be Gone for a Long, Long Time" w. Lew Brown m. Albert Von Tilzer
 "I Wish You all the Luck in the World" w. & m. by Abe Olman
 "I'd Love To Be A Monkey In The Zoo" w. Bert Hanlon m. Willie White
 "I'll Take You Back To Italy" w.m. Irving Berlin
 "I'm All Bound Round With The Mason-Dixon Line" w. Sam M. Lewis & Joe Young m. Jean Schwartz
 "I'm Always Chasing Rainbows" w. Joseph McCarthy m. Harry Carroll (melody adapted from Chopin)
 "If I Find The Guy Who Wrote "Poor Butterfly"" w. William Jerome m. Arthur Green
 "Indiana" w. Ballard MacDonald m. James F. Hanley
 "Indianola" m. Henry R. Stern & Domenico Savino
 "Joan of Arc, They Are Calling You" w. Alfred Bryan & Willie Weston m. Jack Wells

 "Johnson Rag" m. Guy H. Hall & Henry Kleinhauf
 "Just A Baby's Prayer At Twilight" w. Sam M. Lewis & Joe Young  m. M. K. Jerome
 "Leave It To Jane" w. P. G. Wodehouse m. Jerome Kern
 "Let's All Be Americans Now" w.m. Irving Berlin, Edgar Leslie & George W. Meyer
 "Lily Of The Valley" w. L. Wolfe Gilbert m. Anatole Friedland
 "Little Mother Of Mine" w. Walter H. Brown m. Harry T. Burleigh
 "Little Sir Echo" w. Laura R. Smith m. J. S. Fearis

 "Livery Stable Blues" Alcide Nunez & Ray Lopez
 "Lorraine (My Beautiful Alsace Lorraine)" w. Alfred Bryan m. Fred Fisher
 "Love Will Find A Way" w. Harry Graham m. Harold Fraser-Simson.  Introduced by José Collins in the musical The Maid of the Mountains
 "Mad'moiselle From Armentieres" w.m. anon
 "McNamara's Band" w. John J. Stamford m. Shamus O'Connor
 "The Modern Maiden's Prayer" w. Ballard MacDonald m. James F. Hanley
 "My Sunshine Jane" w. J. Keirn Brennan m. Ernest R. Ball
 "My Sweetie" w.m. Irving Berlin
 "'N' Everything" w.m. Al Jolson, B. G. DeSylva & Gus Kahn
 "Napoleon" w. P.G. Wodehouse m. Jerome Kern
 "Nesting Time In Flatbush" w. P. G. Wodehouse m. Jerome Kern
 "Oh It's A Lovely War" w.m. Maurice Scott
 "Oh Johnny, Oh Johnny, Oh!" w. Ed Rose m. Abe Olman
 "Ole Miss Rag" w.m. W. C. Handy
 "On The Road To Home Sweet Home" w. Gus Kahn m. Egbert van Alstyne
 "Ostrich Walk" m. Edwin B. Edwards, Nick LaRocca, Tony Spargo & Larry Shields
 "Out Where The West Begins" w. Arthur Chapman m. Estelle Philleo
 "Over There" w.m. George M. Cohan
 "Paddy McGinty's Goat" w.m. R.P. Weston, Bert Lee & The Two Bobs
 "A Paradise For Two" w. Frank Clifford Harris & Valentine m. James W. Tate
 "Regretful Blues" w. Grant Clarke m. Cliff Hess
 "Reflection Rag" m. Scott Joplin
 "The Road To Paradise" w. Rida Johnson Young m. Sigmund Romberg from the musical Maytime
 "Rockaway" by Howard Johnson
 "Rolled Into One" w. P. G. Wodehouse m. Jerome Kern
 "Rose Room" w. Harry Williams m. Art Hickman
 "Sailin' Away On The Henry Clay" w. Gus Kahn m. Egbert Van Alstyne
 "Say a Prayer for the Boys "Out There"" w. Bernie Grossman m. Alex Marr
 "Send Me Away With A Smile" w.m. Louis Weslyn & Al Piantadosi
 "Shim-Me-Sha-Wabble" m. Spencer Williams
 "Sing Me Love's Lullaby" w. Dorothy Terris m. Theodore F. Morse
 "The Siren's Song" w. P. G. Wodehouse m. Jerome Kern
 "Six Times Six Is Thirty-Six" w. Bert Hanlon m. William White
 "Slippery Hank" Frank H. Losey
 "Smile And Show Your Dimple" w.m. Irving Berlin (reworked 1933 as "Easter Parade")
 "Smiles" w. J. Will Callahan m. Lee S. Roberts
 "Some Sunday Morning" w. Gus Kahn & Raymond B. Egan m. Richard A. Whiting
 "Somewhere In France" w. Arthur Wimperis m. Herbert Ivey
 "Somewhere In France (Is The Lily)" w. Philander Chase Johnson m. Joseph E. Howard
 "Southern Gals" w. Jack Yellen m. Albert Gumble
 "The Story Book Ball" w.m. Billie Montgomery & George Perry
 "Sweet Emalina My Gal" w. Henry Creamer m. Turner Layton
 "That's The Kind Of Baby For Me" w.m. Jack Egan & Alfred Harrison
 "There Are Fairies At The Bottom Of Our Garden" w.m. Liza Lehmann
 "There's A Lump Of Sugar Down In Dixie" w. Alfred Bryan & Jack Yellen m. Albert Gumble
 "There's Something Nice About The South" w.m. Irving Berlin
 "They Go Wild Simply Wild Over Me" w. Joseph McCarthy m. Fred Fisher
 "They'll Be Whistling It All Over Town" w. E Ray Goetz m.Jean Schwartz
 "Thine Alone" w. Henry Blossom m. Victor Herbert
 "The Tickle Toe" w. Otto Harbach m. Louis Hirsch
 "Tiger Rag" w. Harry De Costa m. Edwin B. Edwards, Nick La Rocca, Tony Sbarbaro, Henry Ragas & Larry Shields
 "Till The Clouds Roll By" w. P. G. Wodehouse, Guy Bolton & Jerome Kern m. Jerome Kern
 "Ugly Chile" w.m. Clarence Williams
 "The Waggle O' The Kilt" w.m. Harry Lauder
 "Wait Till The Cows Come Home" w. Anne Caldwell m. Ivan Caryll
 "When the Boys Come Home" w. John Hay m. Oley Speaks
 "When Yankee Doodle Learns To Parlez Vous Francais" w. Will Hart m. Edward G. Nelson
 "Where Do We Go From Here?" w. Howard Johnson m. Percy Wenrich
 "Where The Morning Glories Grow" w. Gus Kahn & Raymond B. Egan m. Richard A. Whiting
 "Why Am I Always The Bridesmaid?" w.m. Fred Leigh, Charles Collins & Lily Morris
 "Will You Remember?" w. Rida Johnson Young m. Sigmund Romberg
 "Wonder Eyes" m. Percy E. Fletcher
 "Yah-De-Dah" m. Mel B. Kaufman
 "You Brought Ireland Right Over To Me" w. J. Keirn Brennan m. Ernest R. Ball
 "You Never Knew About Me" w. P. G. Wodehouse m. Jerome Kern

Hit recordings

"Livery Stable Blues/Dixie Jass One Step" by the Original Dixieland Jass Band
"Goodbye Broadway, Hello France" by the American Quartet
"A Bachelor Gay" by Peter Dawson
"I Don't Want To Get Well" by Van & Schenck
"Joe Turner Blues" by Wilbur Sweatman
"Long Boy" by Byron G. Harlan With The Peerless Quartet
"Over There"  recorded by
Billy Murray
Nora Bayes
"Poor Butterfly" by the Victor Military Band
"That's The Kind Of A Baby For Me" by Eddie Cantor
"The Waggle O' The Kilt" by Harry Lauder
"Yaddie Kaddie Kiddie Kaddie Koo" by Van & Schenck

Classical music
Arnold Bax – November Woods
Lili Boulanger – Psaume 130 (Du fond de l'abîme)
Frank Bridge – Cello Sonata in D minor
John Alden Carpenter
The Birthday of the Infanta, ballet
The Home Road for SATB mixed chorus or unison voices and piano
 Symphony No. 1 ("Sermons in Stones")
Carlos Chávez – Sonata fantasia (Piano Sonata No. 1)
Nancy Dalberg – Symphony in C-sharp minor
Claude Debussy – Violin Sonata in G minor
Frederick Delius – Eventyr (Once Upon a Time)
Gabriel Fauré – Cello Sonata No. 1
Alexander Glazunov – Piano Concerto No. 2 in B, Op. 100
Launy Grøndahl – Violin Concerto in D Major
Charles Koechlin
La divine vesprée, ballet
Paysages et marines, Op. 63bis, version for flute, clarinet, string quartet, and piano
Sonata for cello and piano, Op. 66
Carl Nielsen – Chaconne, for piano
Willem Pijper
Symphony No. 1, Pan
Sonatina No. 1, for piano
De Lente Komt, choral
Sergei Prokofiev
Violin Concerto No. 1, Op. 19
Igrok (The Gambler), opera, Op. 24
Mimoletnosti (Visions fugitives), 20 pieces for piano, Op. 22
Piano Sonata No. 3 ("From Old Notebooks"), Op. 28
Piano Sonata No. 4 ("From Old Notebooks"), Op. 29
Symphony No. 1 Classical, Op. 25
Maurice Ravel – Le tombeau de Couperin, for piano
Ottorino Respighi – Ancient Airs and Dances Suite No. 1
Arnold Schoenberg – Verklärte Nacht (string orchestra version)
Jean Sibelius – Humoresques for Violin and Orchestra opp. 87 and 89
Charles Villiers Stanford
Aviator's Hymn, for tenor, bass, choir, and organ
Irish Rhapsody No. 5, in G Minor, for orchestra
Night Thoughts, Op. 148, for piano
"On Windy Way When Morning Breaks", partsong
Sailing Song, partsong, two soprano voices
"St George of England", song
Scènes de ballet, Op. 150, for piano
Sonata No. 1, in F major, Op. 149, for organ
Sonata No. 2 ("Eroica"), in G minor, Op. 151, for organ
Sonata No. 3 ("Britannica"), in D minor, Op. 152, for organ
Igor Stravinsky
Berceuse, for voice and piano
Le chant du rossignol, symphonic poem
Cinq pièces faciles, for piano 4 hands
"Ovsen’", No. 2 from Podblyudnïye (Saucers) (Four Russian Peasant Songs), for women's choir
Song of the Volga Boatmen, arrangement for winds and percussion
Study, for pianola
Valse pour les enfants, for piano (possibly 1916)
Karol Szymanowski
Sonata No. 3, for piano
String Quartet No. 1 in C major
Demeter, cantata
Agave, cantata
Heitor Villa-Lobos
 String Quartet No. 4
 Symphony No. 2 Ascenção (Ascension), revised or completed 1943/44
Eugène Ysaÿe – Exil, for string orchestra of only violins and violas, Op. 25

Opera
Armas Launis – Kullervo
Sergei Prokofiev – The Gambler
Ignatz Waghalter – Jugend
Giacomo Puccini – La rondine,  Opéra de Monte-Carlo, 27 March
 Richard Strauss – Die Frau ohne Schatten
Gabriel von Wayditch – The Caliph's Magician
Alexander Zemlinsky – Eine florentinische Tragödie

Film
Pietro Mascagni – Rapsodia Satanica

Jazz

Musical theatre
 The Beauty Spot West End production opened at the Gaiety Theatre on 22 December and ran for 152 performances
 The Better 'Ole London production opened at the Oxford Theatre on August 4 and ran for 811 performances
 The Boy London production opened at the Adelphi Theatre on September 14 and ran for 801 performances
 Cheep London revue opened at the Vaudeville Theatre on April 26.
 Chu Chin Chow Broadway production opened at the Manhattan Opera House on October 22 and ran for 208 performances
 Eileen opened at the Shubert Theatre on March 19 and ran for 64 performances.
 Hanky Panky London revue opened at the Empire Theatre on March 24
 Jack O'Lantern Broadway production opened at the Globe Theatre on October 16 and ran for 265 performances
 Leave It to Jane Broadway production opened at the Longacre Theatre on August 28 and ran for 167 performances
 The Maid Of The Mountains London production opened at Daly's Theatre on February 10 and ran for 1352 performances
 Maytime Broadway production opened at the Shubert Theatre on August 16 and ran for 492 performances
 Miss 1917 Broadway revue opened at the Century Theatre on November 5 and ran for 72 performances
 Oh, Boy! (musical) Broadway production opened at the Princess Theatre on February 20 and ran for 463 performances
 The Riviera Girl Broadway production opened at the New Amsterdam Theatre on September 24 and ran for 78 performances
 Arlette West End production opened at the Shaftesbury Theatre on 6 September and ran for 280 performances

Births
January 2 – Vera Zorina, German dancer and actress (died 2003)
January 3 – Pierre Dervaux, French operatic conductor, composer and pedagogue (d. 1992)
January 10 – Jerry Wexler, music journalist and record producer (d. 2008)
January 12
Walter Hendl, American conductor, composer and pianist (d. 2007)
Maharishi Mahesh Yogi, major influence on The Beatles (d. 2008)
January 15 – Tiny Timbrell, guitarist (d. 1992)
January 19 – John Raitt, American actor and singer (d. 2005)
February 11 – Arcesia, singer (d. 1983)
February 15 – Denise Scharley, French contralto (d. 2011)
February 18 – Dona Massin, choreographer (d. 2001)
February 25 – Anthony Burgess, composer (d. 1993)
February 27 – George Mitchell, founder of the Black and White Minstrels (d. 2002)
March 2
Desi Arnaz, musician, actor and producer (d. 1986)
John Gardner, composer (d. 2011)
March 7 – Janet Collins, dancer and choreographer (d. 2003)
March 12 – Leonard Chess, founder of Chess Records (d. 1969)
March 17 – Brian Boydell, Irish composer (d. 2000)
March 18 – Riccardo Brengola, violinist (d. 2004)
March 19 – Dinu Lipatti, pianist (d. 1950)
March 20 – Vera Lynn, singer (d. 2020)
March 21 – Anton Coppola, opera conductor (d. 2020)
March 23
Josef Locke, tenor (d. 1999)
Oscar Shumsky, violinist (d. 2000)
March 26 – Rufus Thomas, singer (d. 2001)
March 30
Els Aarne, composer (d. 1995)
Rudolf Brucci, composer (d. 2002)
April 9 – Johannes Bobrowski, lyricist (d. 1965)
April 12 – Helen Forrest, American jazz singer (d. 1999)
April 22 – Yvette Chauviré, ballerina (d. 2016)
April 25 – Ella Fitzgerald, jazz singer (d. 1996)
April 30 – Bea Wain, US big band singer (d. 2017)
May 1
Danielle Darrieux, singer and actress (d. 2017)
Lily Lian, street singer (d. 2020)
May 14
Lou Harrison, US composer (d. 2003)
Norman Luboff, US choral director (d. 1987)
May 16 – Vera Rózsa, singer and voice teacher (d. 2010)
May 21 – Dennis Day, US singer (d. 1988)
May 22 – Georg Tintner, Austrian conductor (d. 1999)
May 28 – Papa John Creach, fiddler (Jefferson Airplane) (d. 1994)
June 4 – Robert Merrill, operatic baritone (d. 2004)
June 7 – Dean Martin, singer and actor (d. 1995)
June 19 – Dave Lambert, US singer and arranger (d. 1966)
June 29 
Sylvia Olden Lee, vocal coach and accompanist (d. 2004)
Ulpio Minucci, songwriter and composer (d. 2007)
June 24 – Ramblin' Tommy Scott, American singer and guitarist (d. 2013)
June 30 – Lena Horne, singer (died 2010)
July 2 – Murry Wilson, American songwriter, producer and manager (d. 1973)
July 14 – Roshan, Bollywood composer (d. 1967)
July 17 – Red Sovine, American country & folk singer-songwriter (d. 1980)
July 24
Henri Betti, French composer and pianist (d. 2005)
Robert Farnon, composer (d. 2005)
Leonor Orosa Goquinco, pianist and dancer (d. 2005)
August 3 – Antonio Lauro, guitarist and composer (d. 1986)
August 17 – Walter Brown, blues shouter (d. 1956)
August 22 – John Lee Hooker, blues musician (d. 2001)
August 23 – Tex Williams, American country singer (d. 1985)
September 5 – Art Rupe, founder of Specialty Records (d. 2022)
September 11 – Myrta Silva, singer and composer (d. 1987)
September 13 – Robert Ward, composer (d. 2013)
September 15 – Richard Arnell, English composer (d. 2009)
September 30 – Buddy Rich, American jazz drummer (d. 1987)
October 4 – Violeta Parra, Chilean folk musician (suicide 1967)
October 7 – June Allyson, American singer and actress (d. 2006)
October 10 – Thelonious Monk, American jazz pianist (d. 1982)
October 13 – George Osmond, father of the Osmond brothers (d. 2007)
October 21
William Adam, trumpeter (d. 2013)
Dizzy Gillespie, jazz musician (d. 1993)
October 24 – Mike Pedicin, jazz bandleader (d. 2016)
October 31 – Anna Marly, French singer-songwriter (d. 2006)
November 12
Hedley Jones, Jamaican musician (d. 2017)
Jo Stafford, American pop singer (d. 2008)

Deaths
January – Friederike Grün, operatic soprano (born 1836)
January 13 – Albert Niemann, Wagnerian tenor (b. 1831)
February 10 – Emile Pessard, French composer (b. 1843)
February 25 – Paul Rubens, English songwriter (b. 1875)
March 1 – Antonina Miliukova, widow of Pyotr Ilyich Tchaikovsky (b. 1848)
March 4 – Julius Bechgaard, Danish composer (b. 1843)
March 25 – Spyridon Samaras, composer (b. 1861)
April 1 – Scott Joplin, ragtime composer (b. 1868)
April 29 – Florence Farr, actress, singer and composer (b. 1860)
May 20 – Romilda Pantaleoni, operatic soprano (b. 1847)
May 25 – Edouard de Reszke, operatic bass (b. 1853)
June 12 – Teresa Carreño, pianist, singer and conductor (b. 1853)
July 16 – Philipp Scharwenka, composer (b. 1847)
August 7 – Basil Hood, librettist and lyricist (b. 1864)
August 12 – Pavel Gerdt, dancer (b. 1844)
September 5 – Marie Hanfstängl, operatic soprano (b. 1848)
September 8 – Charles Edouard Lefebvre, French composer (b. 1843)
September 11 – Evie Greene, actress and singer (b. 1875)
October 3 – Eduardo di Capua, singer and songwriter (b. 1865)
December 7 – Ludwig Minkus, violinist and composer (b. 1826)
December 9 – Nat M. Wills, singer, comedian, and actor (b. 1873)

References

 
20th century in music
Music by year